Chiaraviglio is a surname of Italian origin. Notable people with the surname include:

Enrichetta Chiaraviglio-Giolitti (1871-1959), Italian philanthropist and activist 
Germán Chiaraviglio (born 1987), Argentine pole vaulter
Valeria Chiaraviglio (born 1989), Argentine pole vaulter, sister of Germán

Surnames of Italian origin